West Sydney was an electoral district for the Legislative Assembly in the Australian State of New South Wales created in 1859 from part of the electoral district of Sydney, covering the western part of the current Sydney central business district, Ultimo and Pyrmont, bordered by George Street, Broadway, Bay Street and Wentworth Park. It elected four members simultaneously, with voters casting four votes and the first four candidates being elected. For the 1894 election, it was replaced by the single-member electorates of Sydney-Gipps, Sydney-Lang, Sydney-Denison and Sydney-Pyrmont.

Members for West Sydney

Election results

References

Former electoral districts of New South Wales
1859 establishments in Australia
Constituencies established in 1859
1894 disestablishments in Australia
Constituencies disestablished in 1894